Ball-e Dad Rahman (also Romanized as Ball-e Dād Raḩmān and Bal-e Dād Raḩmān) is a village in Bahu Kalat Rural District, Dashtiari District, Chabahar County, Sistan and Baluchestan Province, Iran. At the 2006 census, its population was 120, in 21 families.

References 

Populated places in Chabahar County